Tony Rebel Meets Garnett Silk in a Dancehall Conference is a collaboration studio album, by Tony Rebel and Garnett Silk. It was the second and final collaboration album between the two.

Track listing

Reception
AllMusic gave the album a very positive review along with 4.5 stars stating: 

Billboard also gave a fairly positive review saying that

References

1994 albums